Fringe science refers to ideas whose attributes include being highly speculative or relying on premises already refuted. Fringe science theories are often advanced by persons who have no traditional academic science background, or by researchers outside the mainstream discipline. The general public has difficulty distinguishing between science and its imitators, and in some cases a "yearning to believe or a generalized suspicion of experts is a very potent incentive to accepting pseudoscientific claims".

The term "fringe science" covers everything from novel hypotheses which can be tested by means of the scientific method to wild ad hoc hypotheses and mumbo jumbo.  This has resulted in a tendency to dismiss all fringe science as the domain of pseudoscientists, hobbyists, and quacks.

A concept that was once accepted by the mainstream scientific community may become fringe science because of a later evaluation of previous research. For example, focal infection theory, which held that focal infections of the tonsils or teeth are a primary cause of systemic disease, was once considered to be medical fact. It has since been dismissed because of lack of evidence.

Description
The boundary between fringe science and pseudoscience is disputed. The connotation of "fringe science" is that the enterprise is rational but is unlikely to produce good results for a variety of reasons, including incomplete or contradictory evidence. Pseudoscience, however, is something that is not scientific but is incorrectly characterised as science.

The term may be considered pejorative. For example, Lyell D. Henry Jr. wrote that, "fringe science [is] a term also suggesting kookiness." This characterization is perhaps inspired by the eccentric behavior of many researchers of the kind known colloquially (and with considerable historical precedent) as mad scientists.

Although most fringe science is rejected, the scientific community has come to accept some portions of it. One example of such is plate tectonics, an idea which had its origin in the fringe science of continental drift and was rejected for decades.

Examples

Historical
Some historical ideas that are considered to have been refuted by mainstream science are:

Wilhelm Reich's work with orgone, a physical energy he claimed to have discovered, contributed to his alienation from the psychiatric community. He was eventually sentenced to two years in a federal prison, where he died. At that time and continuing today, scientists disputed his claim that he had scientific evidence for the existence of orgone. Nevertheless, amateurs and a few fringe researchers continued to believe that orgone is real.
Focal infection theory (FIT) as the primary cause of systemic disease rapidly became accepted by mainstream dentistry and medicine after World War I. This acceptance was largely based upon what later turned out to be fundamentally flawed studies. As a result, millions of people were subjected to needless dental extractions and surgeries. The original studies supporting FIT began falling out of favor in the 1930s. By the late 1950s, it was regarded as a fringe theory.
The Clovis First theory held that the Clovis culture was the first culture in North America. It was long regarded as a mainstream theory until mounting evidence of a pre-Clovis culture discredited it.

Modern
Relatively recent fringe sciences include:

 Aubrey de Grey, featured in a 2006 60 Minutes special report, is  studying human longevity. He calls his work "strategies for engineered negligible senescence" (SENS). Many mainstream scientists believe his research is fringe science (especially his view of the importance of nuclear epimutations and his timeline for antiaging therapeutics). In a 2005 article in Technology Review (part of a larger series), it was stated that "SENS is highly speculative. Many of its proposals have not been reproduced, nor could they be reproduced with today's scientific knowledge and technology. Echoing Myhrvold, we might charitably say that de Grey's proposals exist in a kind of antechamber of science, where they wait (possibly in vain) for independent verification. SENS does not compel the assent of many knowledgeable scientists; but neither is it demonstrably wrong."
 A nuclear fusion reaction called cold fusion which occurs near room temperature and pressure was reported by chemists Martin Fleischmann and Stanley Pons in March 1989. Numerous research efforts at the time were unable to replicate their results. Subsequently, a number of scientists have worked on cold fusion or have participated in international conferences on it. In 2004, the United States Department of Energy commissioned a panel on cold fusion to take another look at it. They wanted to determine whether their policies concerning it should be altered because of new evidence.
The theory of abiogenic petroleum origin holds that petroleum was formed from deep carbon deposits, perhaps dating to the formation of the Earth. The ubiquity of hydrocarbons in the solar system is taken as evidence that there may be a great deal more petroleum on Earth than commonly thought, and that petroleum may originate from carbon-bearing fluids which migrate upward from the Earth's mantle. Abiogenic hypotheses saw a revival in the last half of the twentieth century by Russian and Ukrainian scientists. More interest was generated in the West after the 1999 publication by Thomas Gold of The Deep Hot Biosphere. Gold's version of the theory is partly based on the existence of a biosphere composed of thermophile bacteria in the Earth's crust, which might explain the existence of certain biomarkers in extracted petroleum.

Accepted as mainstream
Some theories that were once rejected as fringe science, but were eventually accepted as mainstream science, are:

 Plate tectonics
 The existence of Troy
 Heliocentrism
 Norse colonization of the Americas
 The Big Bang theory
Helicobacter pylori bacteria as the causative agent of peptic ulcer disease
The germ theory of disease
Neanderthal-Homo sapiens hybridization

Responding to fringe science
Michael W. Friedlander has suggested some guidelines for responding to fringe science, which, he argues, is a more difficult problem than scientific misconduct. His suggested methods include impeccable accuracy, checking cited sources, not overstating orthodox science, thorough understanding of the Wegener continental drift example, examples of orthodox science investigating radical proposals, and prepared examples of errors from fringe scientists.

Friedlander suggests that fringe science is necessary so that mainstream science will not atrophy. Scientists must evaluate the plausibility of each new fringe claim, and certain fringe discoveries "will later graduate into the ranks of accepted" — while others "will never receive confirmation".

Margaret Wertheim profiled many "outsider scientists" in her book Physics on the Fringe, who receive little or no attention from professional scientists.  She describes all of them as trying to make sense of the world using the scientific method, but in the face of not being able to understand the complex theories of modern science.  She also finds it fair that credentialed scientists do not bother spending a lot of time learning about and explaining problems with the fringe theories of uncredentialed scientists, since the authors of those theories have not taken the time to understand the mainstream theories they aim to disprove.

Controversies

As Donald E. Simanek asserts, "Too often speculative and tentative hypotheses of cutting edge science are treated as if they were scientific truths, and so accepted by a public eager for answers." But the public is ignorant of the fact that "As science progresses from ignorance to understanding it must pass through a transitional phase of confusion and uncertainty."

The media also play a role in propagating the belief that certain fields of science are controversial. In their 2003 paper "Optimising Public Understanding of Science and Technology in Europe: A Comparative Perspective", Jan Nolin et al. write that "From a media perspective it is evident that controversial science sells, not only because of its dramatic value, but also since it is often connected to high-stake societal issues."

See also

 Books
 13 Things That Don't Make Sense (a book by Michael Brooks)
 The Structure of Scientific Revolutions (a book by Thomas S. Kuhn)

References

Bibliography
 
 
 

 
 
 CSICOP On-line: Scientifically Investigating Paranormal and Fringe Science Claims—Committee for Skeptical Inquiry

External links

 
Science
Scientific method